Edward Henry Murphy (c1796 Dublin - 1847 Dublin) was an Irish painter of flowers, birds and still life. He studied art at the School of the Royal Dublin Society. He also produced caricatures for the Dublin media. He taught art, painted flower and fruit pieces and, on occasion, landscapes. He exhibited mainly in Dublin in the period 1812 to 1821, and with the Royal Hibernian Academy from 1826 to 1841, to which he was elected an Associate in November 1829. He died by suicide in 1847.

The National Gallery of Ireland has his painting "Parroquets," which earlier belonged to Sir Maziere Brady, Bart., former Lord Chancellor of Ireland.

References

Irish painters
Botanical illustrators
1790s births
1847 deaths